Carlos Roselló Betbeze (May 2, 1922 – before 2004) was a Uruguayan basketball player who competed in the 1948 and the 1952 Summer Olympics. Rosello was part of the Uruguayan basketball team, which finished fifth in the 1948 tournament. Four years later Rosello was a member of the Uruguayan team, which won the bronze medal. He played four matches.

References

External links

1922 births
Year of death missing
Sportspeople from Montevideo
Basketball players at the 1948 Summer Olympics
Basketball players at the 1952 Summer Olympics
Olympic basketball players of Uruguay
Olympic bronze medalists for Uruguay
Uruguayan men's basketball players
Olympic medalists in basketball
Medalists at the 1952 Summer Olympics
1954 FIBA World Championship players